Samyuktha Varma (born 28 November 1979) is a former Indian actress who was active in Malayalam films from 1999 to 2002. She made her debut in 1999 as female lead in the movie Veendum Chila Veettukaryangal for which she won her first Kerala State Film Award for Best Actress, since then she has acted in a total of 18 films. Varma has won two Kerala State Film Award for Best Actress and two Filmfare Award for Best Actress. She is married to actor Biju Menon, since 2002.

Early life 
She was born on 28 November 1979 to Ravi Varma and Uma Varma. When she was studying at Sree Kerala Varma college, Thrissur, she got an offer to do female lead role in Veendum Chila Veettukaryangal.

Film career 
Her debut was in Veendum Chila Veettukaryangal in 1999, followed by Vazhunnor and Chandranudikkunna Dikkil in 2000.

In 2000 she acted in Nadanpennum Naattupramaaniyum directed by Rajasenan, Fazil's production Life is Beautiful, Angane Oru Avadhikaalathu directed by Mohan, Mazha directed by Lenin Rajendran based on a short story by Madhavikutty, Madhuranombarakaattu and Swayamvarapanthal.

At the end of 2002, she was cast in Rafi-Mecartin's Thenkasi Pattanam and Rajasenan's Megasandesam.

She was also approached to play the female lead in Baba opposite to Rajinikanth, but she declined as she did not wish to work post marriage.

Personal life 

She married Biju Menon on 23 November 2002. The couple have a son, Daksh Dharmik, born 14 September 2006.

Awards and honours

Filmography

References

External links
 
 Lynda Polygreen. "Bollywood Farce: Indian Actress and Family Are Detained" (18 July 2002) and "Actress's Detainment Upsets Indians in U.S. and Abroad" (19 July 2002), New York Times.

Actresses from Thrissur
Actresses in Malayalam cinema
Living people
Kerala State Film Award winners
Actresses in Tamil cinema
Sree Kerala Varma College alumni
Filmfare Awards South winners
People from Thiruvalla
20th-century Indian actresses
Indian film actresses
1979 births
21st-century Indian actresses